King Kelani Tissa is a king who ruled Kelaniya of Sri Lanka . His brother was Uttiya. His daughter was Viharamahadevi. The legends say that because he had punished an innocent monk the gods  got angry and made the ocean come inland causing a flood. To stop the flood he had to sacrifice his daughter to the ocean. He punished the monk due to his brother Uttiya. The King's Buddhism teacher was an Arahant  so the Arahant and his disciples were given the morning meal daily.

King Kelani Tissa's  brother, Uttiya, was not a very disciplined person. Uttiya had an interest in the queen. So he made advancements to start an affair. Gradually the King got to know about this, so Uttiya fled to Ruhunu and had to live in hiding.

Uttiya had mastered the hand writing of an Arahant, and wrote a letter to the queen, his brother's wife, emulating the hand writing of an Arahant. He dressed a person as a bhikku, to join the Arahant and his disciples at the palace morning meal, in order to deliver the letter to the queen safely. The person was able to drop the letter near the queen, however the King came and picked it up.

The King was furious and mislead by his brother's plot, he deemed that the Arahant was responsible as it was written in an Arahant's hand writing. The King immediately ordered the Arahant to be put into a cauldron of boiling oil for a slow and painful death, and the person disguised as a bhikku to be immediately killed. His orders were carried out and the Arahant was killed in front of all monks and laymen. The dying Arahant didn't bare any ill-will for the King, however he died after delivering one hundred sermons to the crowd assembled. Their bodies were dropped to the ocean.

Legends say that the ocean and tidal waves started coming inland and covered up to nearly 28 miles inside the kingdom, just like tsunamis. A proposal was put out that the King's daughter, Viharamaha devi, should be sacrificed in order to save the remaining part of the kingdom. She willingly sacrificed herself in order to save her motherland. A vessel with the inscription that the madien in it was King Kelani Tissa's  daughter. The vessel was prepared and launched into the sea. 

Sinhalese royalty